The 2010 VFF National Super League was the qualifying competition for the 2010–11 OFC Champions League.

The club who advanced to this tournament was Amicale FC, Vanuatu's sole representative at the competition.

Teams 
All 5 teams who competed were the top 5 from the 2009–10 Port Vila Premier League, the top division of football in the Port Vila Football Association (the main football association in Vanuatu).
 Amicale FC
 Tafea FC
 Spirit 08
 Tupuji Imere
 Teouma Academy

Standings

References

2009–10 in Vanuatuan football
VFF National Super League seasons